Tony Nash was an Australian professional rugby league player for Canterbury Bankstown in the New South Wales Rugby League premiership. Nash made his first grade debut on 23 May 1942 for Canterbury scoring four tries against South Sydney. Nash played the game as a late replacement for Edgar Newman who had to withdraw due to illness. This equaled Johnno Stuntz's record in the number of tries in an Australian rugby league player's first grade debut, which was only to be equalled again after Nash, 66 years later by Jordan Atkins.

Footnotes

References 
 Canterbury Bankstown RL History
 Atkins scores four tries on debut
 Jordan so flash in dream debut

Australian rugby league players
Canterbury-Bankstown Bulldogs players
Year of birth missing (living people)
Rugby league locks
Possibly living people
Place of birth missing (living people)